is a Japanese manga series written and illustrated by Kenzi Taketomi. It was adapted into a Japanese television drama series in 2011 and into a film that premiered on 12 January 2013.

Cast
Hiroki Hasegawa
Asami Usuda
Tomoko Tabata

References

External links

Futabasha manga
2005 manga
2011 Japanese television series debuts
2011 Japanese television series endings
Japanese television dramas based on manga
Manga adapted into films
Seinen manga
TV Tokyo original programming
Japanese drama films